Doris í Garði Olafsdóttir (née Joensen; born 13 July 1986) is a Faroese former footballer who played as a centre back. She has been a member of the Faroe Islands women's national team.

References

1986 births
Living people
Women's association football central defenders
Faroese women's footballers
People from Eiði Municipality
Faroe Islands women's international footballers